Aulodesmus is a genus of millipedes belonging to the family Gomphodesmidae.

Species
Aulodesmus eminens
Aulodesmus levigatus
Aulodesmus mossambicus
Aulodesmus oxygonus
Aulodesmus perarmatus
Aulodesmus peringueyi
Aulodesmus rugosus
Aulodesmus trepidans
Aulodesmus tuberosus

References

Polydesmida
Millipedes of Africa